Palenque Canton is a canton of Ecuador, located in the Los Ríos Province.  Its capital is the town of Palenque.  Its population at the 2001 census was 20,658.

Demographics
Ethnic groups as of the Ecuadorian census of 2010:
Montubio  69.0%
Mestizo  23.4%
Afro-Ecuadorian  5.1%
White  2.1%
Indigenous  0.2%
Other  0.2%

References

Cantons of Los Ríos Province